Dixie National Forest is a United States National Forest in Utah with headquarters in Cedar City. The largest national forest in Utah, it straddles the divide between the Great Basin and the Colorado River. In descending order of forestland area it is located in parts of Garfield, Washington, Iron, Kane, Wayne, and Piute counties. The majority (over 55%) of forest acreage lies in Garfield County.

The southern rim of the Great Basin, near the Colorado River, provides spectacular scenery. Colorado River canyons are made up of multi-colored cliffs and steep-walled gorges.

The Forest is divided into four geographic areas. High altitude forests in gently rolling hills characterize the Markagunt, Paunsaugunt, and Aquarius Plateaus. The forest includes the Pine Valley Mountains north of St. George.

The Forest has many climatic extremes. At the higher elevations, most of the annual precipitation falls as snow. Thunderstorms are common during July and August and produce heavy rains. In some areas, August is the wettest month of the year.

Temperature extremes can be impressive, with summer temperatures exceeding  near St. George and winter lows exceeding  on the plateau tops.

The vegetation of the Forest grades from sparse, desert-type plants at the lower elevations to stand of low-growing pinyon pine and juniper dominating the mid-elevations. At the higher elevations, aspen and conifers such as pine, spruce, and fir predominate.

The Dixie Forest Reserve was established on September 25, 1905 by the General Land Office. The name was derived from the local description of the warm southern part of Utah as "Dixie". In 1906 the U.S. Forest Service assumed responsibility for the lands, and on March 4, 1907 it became a National Forest.  The western part of Sevier National Forest was added on July 1, 1922, and all of Powell National Forest on October 1, 1944.

Visitor centers
There are local ranger district offices and visitor centers in
Cedar City, with Duck Creek Visitor Center
Escalante, with Escalante Interagency Visitor Center
Pine Valley, in St. George, with Pine Valley Heritage Center
Powell, in Panguitch, with Red Canyon Visitor Center

Wilderness areas
There are four officially designated wilderness areas within Dixie National Forest that are part of the National Wilderness Preservation System.
 Ashdown Gorge Wilderness
 Box-Death Hollow Wilderness
 Cottonwood Forest Wilderness
 Pine Valley Mountain Wilderness

See also
 List of U.S. national forests
 Panguitch Lake
 Bryce Canyon Natural History Association
 List of Utah Wilderness areas
 Podunk
 Paunsaugunt Plateau
 West Valley Fire

References

External links

Official website
Podunk Guard Station

 
1905 establishments in Utah
Protected areas established in 1905
Protected areas of Garfield County, Utah
Protected areas of Washington County, Utah
Protected areas of Iron County, Utah
Protected areas of Kane County, Utah
Protected areas of Wayne County, Utah
Protected areas of Piute County, Utah